The fulvous-vented euphonia (Euphonia fulvicrissa) is a species of bird in the family Fringillidae, formerly placed in the Thraupidae

It is found in the Tumbes-Chocó-Magdalena. Its natural habitats are subtropical or tropical moist lowland forests and heavily degraded former forest.

References

BeautyOfBirds, formerly Avian Web

fulvous-vented euphonia
Birds of the Tumbes-Chocó-Magdalena
fulvous-vented euphonia
fulvous-vented euphonia
Taxonomy articles created by Polbot